Simola is a Finnish surname. Notable people with the surname include:

 Seppo Simola (1936–2003), Finnish shot putter
 Seija Simola (1944–2017), Finnish singer
 Mika Simola (born 1985), Finnish racing cyclist

Finnish-language surnames
Surnames of Finnish origin